Sirens Aquatic Sports Club  is an aquatic sports club with over 500 fully paid up members, one of the largest of its kind in Malta. The club is run by an elected committee which devolves some of its duties and tasks to various sub-committees. All committee and sub-committee members are volunteers and receive no payment for their work.

The statute of the club lays down the scope for the existence of the same club which is:

The promotion of waterpolo, swimming and other aquatic sports.
The observance of the rules of the clubs and those organizations to which the club is affiliated.)
The promotion of a sporting spirit, particularly amongst its young athletes.
The development and maintenance of the club premises and facilities

For many years Sirens ASC has been in the forefront of Maltese aquatic sports and has faced many challenges that would have defeated a less strong minded group of people. In 1998 the club premises were destroyed by a vicious storm but they were not only rebuilt within a few months to higher standard but the club went on to develop what is now Malta's number one private water sports facility.

Financially the club is dependent on the rentals of its facilities, sponsors, donors and its members. Over the past fifty years the club has grown from a humble wooden shack on a barren rock by the sea to a fully fledged facility used by thousands of patrons every summer.

All this has been made possible by the hard work of a group of people who every year dedicates most of their free time to the service of the club, its members and the local community and obviously to its president Dr. Vella who every year dedicates a lot of his time and money towards the good of the club

Premises
On 8 December 1988, the clubhouse was destroyed in a storm, together with trophies and club records. The clubhouse was then rebuilt and refurbished several times, by club president, Lino Vella and club vice president, John Farrugia.

On 6th August 2017, the club launched a €10,000,000 investment to revamp the club's premises and facilities, to modernize and add 2 swimming pools (50x25 outdoor and 25x13 indoor), add a state of the art gym,2 fully equipped restaurants as well as club offices. The construction of the Sirens Pool was completed in September 2021 ready to be used and the club's indoor pool and state of the art gym are set to be completed by March 2023.

Front office
 President: Dr Carmellino Vella
V.President: Mr. John Farrugia
CEO : Mr. Sean Aquilina
Secretary : Mr. Arthur Perici
Treausurer: Mr. Kristian Montfort
Members :  Sven Xerri, Walter Degiorgio, Patrick Xuereb

Coaching staff
Head Coach : Marko Orlovic 
Asst.Coach : Igor Vukanovic 
Technical Officer : Kris Montfort 
Team Manager : Dale Dowling  
Team Physio: Max Borg  
Youth Coach : Igor Vukanovic 
Development Coach : Anna Goncharenko 
Head Women's Coach: Dale Dowling 
Head  Women's Asst. Coach : Marko Orlovic 
Women's Team Manager : Kris Montfort

First team

Season 22/23

 Thomas Micallef (GK) (C)
 Matthew Bonello Du Puis (GK)
  John Napier
 Matthias Azzopardi
  Mikhael Cutajar
  Ken Erdogan
  Isaiah Riolo
  Matthew Sciberras 
  Jerome Zerafa Gregory
 Jake Cachia
  Gabriel Melillo
  Paul Serracino
  Gianni Farrugia
 Matthew Chircop
 Kydon Agius

Notable former foreign players
  Jan Evert Veer
  Tamás Märcz
  Francesco Porzio
  Zsolt Varga
  Predrag Zimonjić
  Árpád Babay
 Csaba Kiss
 Christian Presciutti
 Nicolas Constantin Bicari
 Sergi Mora
 Valentino Gallo
 Pietro Figlioli

Notable coaches
  John Farrugia 
 Dirk Dowling
 Sandro Campagna
  Marco Baldineti
  Paolo De Crescenzo
   Marco Risso 
  Sergio Afrić
 Marko Pantovic
  Sasko Popovski
 Pino Dragojevic
 Marko Orlovic
 Igor Vukanovic

References

External links
 Sport Malta Directory
 Official Website

Water polo clubs in Malta
Sports clubs established in 1930
1930 establishments in Malta